La Balisa (1,411 m) is a high mountain pass of the Swiss Alps, connecting Schwarzsee with Charmey via La Valsainte in the canton of Fribourg. The pass lies on the watershed between the Sense and Le Javro. The pass is traversed by a trail.

References

External links
La Balisa on Hikr

Mountain passes of the Alps
Mountain passes of the canton of Fribourg